Kuwait has competed in 12 Summer Games. To date, Kuwait has won three bronze Olympic medals.

In the 1992 Barcelona Games, Kuwait received a bronze medal in the then-demonstration sport of taekwondo. Their first Olympic medal was a bronze for double trap shooting, won by Fehaid Al-Deehani at the 2000 Olympics in Sydney. Their second was also a bronze won by Al-Deehani in the men's trap at the 2012 Summer Olympics in London. In 2016, Al-Deehani won the gold medal for men's double trap as an independent athlete.

The National Olympic Committee for Kuwait was formed in 1957. It was recognized by the International Olympic Committee in 1966, but has been suspended twice in the past ten years. 

Due to its most recent suspension, Kuwait was not allowed to compete as a sovereign state at the 2016 Summer Olympics, though the nation's participants were able to compete as Independent Olympic Athletes under the Olympic flag. At those games, Kuwaiti shooters Fehaid Al-Deehani and Abdullah Al-Rashidi   won a gold medal and bronze medal respectively as independent athletes.

Participation

Timeline of participation

Combined medals

Medal tables

Medals by Summer Games

Medals by summer sport

List of medalists

See also
 List of flag bearers for Kuwait at the Olympics
 Kuwait at the Paralympics

References

External links
 
 
 

 
Olympics